Martina Werner (born 28 December 1961) is a German politician and Member of the European Parliament (MEP) representing Germany since July 2014. She is a member of the Social Democratic Party, part of the Party of European Socialists.

Before her election Werner was educated at the Herder School in Kassel before undertaking professional training in hotel management. In 1991 she graduated from the University of Kassel with a degree in economics. She later worked in business development and investment management.

Parliamentary service
Member, Committee on Industry, Research and Energy (2014-)
Member, Delegation to the ACP-EU Joint Parliamentary Assembly (2014-)

In addition to her committee assignments, Werner serves as a member of the European Parliament Intergroup on Western Sahara.

Other activities
 IG Bergbau, Chemie, Energie, Member
 German United Services Trade Union (ver.di), Member

References

1961 births
Living people
Social Democratic Party of Germany MEPs
MEPs for Germany 2014–2019
21st-century women MEPs for Germany
Politicians from Kassel
University of Kassel alumni